Bodens Performing Arts College is a full-time Performing Arts College for students aged 16–19 years based in Barnet, Hertfordshire. The part-time school was established in 1973, leading to the opening of the full-time college in 2012. Students undertake BTEC Level 3 Extended in Performing Arts, Trinity Acting Certificate and a Trinity Level 4 Associate Diploma in Acting or Musical Theatre. The course is performance based and students work with resident tutors on a full-time basis, complemented by guest tutors from across the country, experts in their field.

References

External links

Education in the London Borough of Barnet
New Barnet
Performing arts education in London
Drama schools in the United Kingdom